Jillian Claire Tabart  (born 1941) is a former president of the Assembly of the Uniting Church in Australia and medical practitioner. She served a three-year term as president of the assembly from July 1994 to July 1997, and was the first woman to be elected to the role.

Tabart's father was a Methodist lay preacher. She was born in Melbourne and studied at Methodist Ladies' College, Kew and University of Melbourne. She married Ken in 1966 and the family moved to Tasmania in 1969, initially to Hobart, then to Launceston, following his work opportunities. She was elected Moderator of the Uniting Church Synod of Tasmania, serving in that role from 1983 to 1984.

Tabart was awarded the Medal of the Order of Australia (OAM) in the 2022 Australia Day Honours for "service to the Uniting Church in Australia".

References

Uniting Church in Australia presidents
Australian women medical doctors
Australian medical doctors
Living people
Recipients of the Medal of the Order of Australia
1941 births